The Nautiliaceae are a family of bacteria placed in an order to itself, Nautiliales, or in the order Campylobacterales. The members of the family are all thermophilic. They are:
Caminibacter Alain et al. 2002
Caminibacter hydrogeniphilus Alain et al. 2002
Caminibacter mediatlanticus Voordeckers et al. 2005
Caminibacter profundus Miroshnichenko et al. 2004
Cetia Grosche et al. 2015
Cetia pacifica Grosche et al. 2015
Lebetimonas Takai et al. 2005
Lebetimonas acidiphila Takai et al. 2005
Lebetimonas natsushimae Nagata et al. 2017
Nautilia Miroshnichenko et al. 2002
Nautilia abyssi Alain et al. 2009
Nautilia lithotrophica Miroshnichenko et al. 2002
Nautilia nitratireducens Pérez-Rodríguez et al. 2010
Nautilia profundicola Smith et al. 2008

References

Campylobacterota